Sayyidina Husain Secondary School is a government secondary school in Sengkurong, a settlement in Brunei-Muara District, Brunei. The school provides five years of general secondary education leading up to GCE O Level qualification. It was established in May 1994 and has a student population of around 1,100. The current principal is Dayangku Nooramaliatifah bin Pengiran Ahmad. It is one of the schools under Cluster 2, a school district of the Ministry of Education.

Name 
The school is named after Husayn ibn Ali, a grandson of Muhammad and a prominent figure in Islam.

References 

Secondary schools in Brunei
Cambridge schools in Brunei